Maselspoort is a resort complex in Mangaung in the Free State province of South Africa.

Maselspoort is situated on the banks of the Modder River,  from Bloemfontein. It is a popular resort town for Bloemfontein city dwellers, and a popular fishing spot.

It was originally known as "Mazel's Pass", after a Mr Mazel who owned the land. In 1904 a major water works was opened at Maselspoort, and in 1927 Harvard University erected the Boyden Observatory. The then-Prince George of England stopped at Maselspoort in 1934 as part of a visit to Bloemfontein.

References

Populated places in Mangaung